The Postman is a 1997 American post-apocalyptic action adventure film produced and directed by Kevin Costner, who plays the lead role. The screenplay was written by Eric Roth and Brian Helgeland, based on David Brin's 1985 book of the same name. The film also features Will Patton, Larenz Tate, Olivia Williams, James Russo, and Tom Petty.

It is set in a post-apocalyptic and neo-Western version of the disestablished United States in the then near-future year of 2013, sixteen-plus years after unspecified apocalyptic events, followed by plagues, left a huge impact on human civilization and erased most technology. Like the book, the film follows the story of a nomadic drifter (Costner) who stumbles across the uniform of an old United States Postal Service mail carrier, and unwittingly inspires hope through an empty promise of a "Restored United States of America" and starts his path to become a national hero.

Released on Christmas of 1997 by Warner Bros., The Postman was panned by critics, who criticized the performances, screenplay, direction, and long runtime. Costner's decision to cast himself in the film was also criticized. The film was a box-office bomb, grossing a total of $20 million worldwide against a budget of $80 million. It was nominated for three Saturn Awards but won all five of its Golden Raspberry Award nominations including Worst Picture.

Plot

In 2013, an unnamed nomad wanders the scattered communities of the Utah flatlands, trading performances of long-forgotten Shakespearean plays for food and water. At one town, the nomad is forced at gunpoint into the ranks of the Holnists, a neo-fascist militia, and is branded on his shoulder with their symbol, a figure 8. The Holnists, under their leader, General Bethlehem, are the de facto authority in the area, collecting tribute and recruits from local towns. When the nomad escapes, he takes refuge in a long-deceased postman's mail vehicle.

With the postman's uniform and mail bag, he arrives in the settlement of Pineview claiming to be from the newly-restored U.S. government. He convinces Pineview's leader, Sheriff Briscoe, to let him in by showing a letter addressed to elderly villager Irene March. The postman inspires a teenager named Ford Lincoln Mercury, who asks to be sworn in as a member of the postal service and even helps him set up a post office for the town. The postman also meets spouses Abby and Michael, fulfilling their clinical request to impregnate her. When the postman leaves for the town of Benning, he carries a pile of mail left at the post office door by the townspeople.

During a raid of Pineview, General Bethlehem learns of the postman's tales of a restored government in Minneapolis and becomes afraid of losing power if word spreads. He has the post office burned to the ground, kills Michael and Briscoe, abducts Abby, and raids Benning looking for the postman. The postman surrenders, but Abby saves him from execution, and the two escape into the surrounding mountains. A pregnant Abby and an injured postman ride out the winter in an abandoned cabin. When spring arrives, they leave and run into a girl, who claims to be a postal carrier. She reveals that Mercury has kept the postal service alive by recruiting other carriers and building more post offices. They have established communications with other settlements, creating a quasi-society and inadvertently spreading hope.

Bethlehem continues to hunt and capture postal carriers, all of whom are executed and displayed publicly. Feeling responsible, the postman orders the service to disband and writes a letter to the militia revealing the truth. However, Bethlehem learns to his dismay that the postman's example has spread farther than he could have anticipated when his men capture a carrier from California, and he redoubles his efforts to find the postman. The postman and Abby, closely followed by young carriers Eddie, Ponytail, and Billy, travel to Bridge City. When Bethlehem's scouts catch up, the mayor helps the postman escape on a cable car and urges him to find others willing to resist Bethlehem. Before leaving, he and Abby reciprocate their feelings and fall in love.

In a recitation of King Henry V's speech prior to the siege of Harfleur, the postman rallies himself and his followers to war. The mounted carriers and Holnists meet across a field. Not wanting any more carnage, the postman instead challenges Bethlehem to a personal hand-to-hand duel, with their troops as witnesses. The postman wins the fight but spares Bethlehem's life to maintain morale. Bethlehem tries to shoot the postman in the back with his revolver, but is shot dead by his own second-in-command, Col. Getty. Getty then surrenders, and the rest of the Holnists follow his lead.

Thirty years later, the postman's grown daughter Hope, accompanied by other public figures and servicemen (including postal workers), speaks at a ceremony unveiling a bronze statue by territorial waters in St. Rose, Oregon in tribute to her father, who has recently died (1973–2043). Her speech, along with the fact that all the attendees are wearing modern clothing and using technology, reveal that the postman and his mail carriers' actions have helped rebuild the United States.

Cast

 Kevin Costner as The Postman
 Will Patton as General Bethlehem
 Larenz Tate as Ford Lincoln Mercury
 Olivia Williams as Abby
 James Russo as Captain Idaho
 Tom Petty as Bridge City Mayor
 Daniel von Bargen as Pineview Sheriff Briscoe
 Scott Bairstow as Luke
 Giovanni Ribisi as Bandit 20
 Roberta Maxwell as Irene March
 Joe Santos as Colonel Getty
 Ron McLarty as Old George
 Brian Anthony Wilson as Woody
 Peggy Lipton as Ellen March
 Rex Linn as Mercer
 Shawn Hatosy as Billy
 Ryan Hurst as Eddie March
 Charles Esten as Michael
 Ty O'Neal as Drew
 Tom Bower as Larry
 Mary Stuart Masterson as Hope, Postman's Daughter (uncredited)

Production
On his personal website, author David Brin reveals that while studios were bidding for The Postman, his wife decided during a screening of Field of Dreams that Kevin Costner should portray the title character. Brin agreed that the emotions evoked by Field of Dreams matched the message he intended to deliver with his novel. A decade later, after learning Costner would be cast as the lead, Brin said he was "thrilled". Costner discarded the old screenplay (in which the moral message of the novel had been reversed) and hired screenwriter Brian Helgeland; Brin says the two of them "rescued the 'soul' of the central character" and reverted the story's message back to one of hope. Costner supposedly passed on the lead role in Air Force One to work on The Postman.

In an interview with Metro before filming began, Brin expressed his hope that The Postman would have the "pro-community feel" of Field of Dreams instead of the Mad Max feel of Costner's other post-apocalyptic film Waterworld. Brin said that, unlike typical post-apocalyptic movies that satisfy "little-boy wish fantasies about running amok in a world without rules", the intended moral of The Postman is that "if we lost our civilization, we'd all come to realize how much we missed it, and would realize what a miracle it is simply to get your mail every day."

The Postman was filmed in Metaline Falls and Fidalgo Island, Washington; central Oregon; and southern Arizona around Tucson and Nogales.  Metaline Falls is the location for the community of Pineview in the film.

Despite the film performing disastrously at two test screenings, Costner refused Warner Bros.' appeals that he edit it down from its then-massive three-hour running time.

Music

Reception

Box office
The film was a notable failure at the box office. The first four days after opening brought in only $5.3 million on 2,207 screens. Produced on an estimated $80 million budget, it returned less than $21 million.

The film was subsequently released on VHS and DVD on June 9, 1998, and on Blu-ray Disc on September 8, 2009.

Critical response
The Postman was panned by critics. On review aggregator Rotten Tomatoes, the film has an approval rating of 8% based on 36 reviews, with an average rating of 4/10. The site's consensus states: "A massive miscalculation in self-mythologizing by director and star Kevin Costner, The Postman would make for a goofy good time if it weren't so fatally self-serious." Metacritic gives the film a score of 29 out of 100 based on 14 reviews, indicating "generally unfavorable reviews". Audiences polled by CinemaScore gave the film an average grade of "B−" on an A+ to F scale.

Stephen Holden of the New York Times criticized the movie for its "bogus sentimentality" and "mawkish jingoism". Roger Ebert described The Postman as a failed yet noble effort at a parable, being "goofy", "pretentious", and "way too long", yet "good-hearted". He criticized Costner's putting himself in the lead role, arguing that such roles should be cast against type and that Costner had played too many similar roles in past films. On Siskel & Ebert, Ebert and Gene Siskel gave the film "two thumbs down", with Siskel calling it "Dances with Myself" (in reference to Costner's Oscar-winning film Dances with Wolves) while referring to the bronze statue scene.

Costner defended the film: "I always thought it was a really good movie! I always thought I probably started it wrong. I should have said something like 'once upon a time.' Because it was just like a modern-day fairy tale — it wraps itself up with a storybook ending with the statue. You know, I thought it was a pretty funny movie set against the idea of a Superman — somebody stepping up. But in this case, it’s a very humble guy who's nothing but a liar [laughs] — delivers mail and burns half of it just to stay alive. So, I like the movie."

Accolades

References

Further reading

External links
 
 
 
 
 

 

1997 films
1990s action adventure films
1990s science fiction action films
American action adventure films
American science fiction action films
American science fiction adventure films
1990s English-language films
Films about anti-fascism
Films about censorship
Films about racism
Films about terrorism
Films about the United States Postal Service
Films based on science fiction novels
Films directed by Kevin Costner
Films scored by James Newton Howard
Films set in Oregon
Films set in 2013
Films set in 2043
Films set in the future
Films shot in Bend, Oregon
American alternate history films
Films shot in Washington (state)
Films shot in Arizona
Ku Klux Klan in popular culture
Golden Raspberry Award winning films
American post-apocalyptic films
Warner Bros. films
Films with screenplays by Eric Roth
Films with screenplays by Brian Helgeland
1990s American films